Gymnopilus viridans is a mushroom in the family Hymenogastraceae. It contains the hallucinogens psilocybin and psilocin. It is a rarely documented species, the last known collection being from the US state of Washington in 1912.

Description
Pileus:  — 8 cm, thick, convex with a large umbo, ochraceous, dry, with conspicuous light reddish brown scales that are sparse but become denser toward the center; flesh firm, becoming green-spotted where handled. 
Gills: Adnate, broad, crowded, edges undulate, dingy brown to rusty brown with age.
Spore print: Rusty brown.
Stipe:  — 6 cm in height, 2 cm in diameter, enlarging below, solid, firm, concolorous with the cap.
Microscopic features: Spores 7 x 8.5 x 4 — 5 µm ellipsoid, not dextrinoid, minutely verruculose, obliquely pointed at one end, no germ pore. Pleurocystidia absent, Cheilocystidia 20 — 26 x 5 — 7 µm, caulocystidia 35 — 43 x 4 — 7 µm, clamp connections present.

Habitat and formation 
Gymnopilus viridans is found growing cespitose on coniferous wood from June to November.

References 

  ("For the benefit of those using Saccardo's nomenclature, the following new species in the above article are recombined, as follows: Gymnopilus viridans = Flammula viridans" p. 262)
 Hesler, Mycologia Memoir No. 3 1969, North American Species of Gymnopilus

viridans
Entheogens
Psychoactive fungi
Psychedelic tryptamine carriers
Fungi of North America
Taxa named by William Alphonso Murrill